The Woman in White is a British drama television series which originally aired on BBC 1 in six 25-minute-long episodes between 2 October and 6 November 1966. It was adapted from the 1860 novel The Woman in White by Wilkie Collins.

As of 2021, none of the six episodes are known to exist in the BBC archives.

Plot summary

Main cast
 Alethea Charlton as Marian Halcombe
 Jennifer Hilary as Laura Fairlie 
 Louis Mansi as Professor Pesca 
 Nicholas Pennell as Walter Hartright 
 John Barron as Sir Percival Glyde  
 Geoffrey Bayldon as Mr. Fairlie 
 Francis de Wolff as Count Fosco 
 Alan Collins as Louis
 Daphne Heard as Madame Fosco 
 Anne Dyson as Mrs. Michelson 
 David Langford as Matthews 
 Katherine Parr as Mrs Catherick 
 Elsie Wagstaff as Mrs. Clements

References

External links
 

1960s British drama television series
1966 British television series debuts
BBC television dramas
Films based on works by Wilkie Collins